Ladies' Circle International is a social networking organisation for young women aged between 18 and 45, founded in 1932. It aims to promote friendship through social contact at local, national and international levels and to be of service to the community. For many years Circlers were the wives or partners of members of Round Table, but in 1993 the rules were changed and Ladies' Circle is now open to any woman in the age range 18 - 45, and whilst Ladies' Circle work very closely with Round Table on many issues, both business and social, they are a totally independent organisation.

History
Bournemouth No. 1 circle was created in 1932, by Round Tablers' wives who had helped to organise the 1932 Round Table National Conference.  By 1936 eight circles had formed with the addition of Manchester, Hastings, Liverpool, Middlesbrough, Wolverhampton, Doncaster and Southampton and the National Association of Ladies' Circles of Great Britain & Ireland (NALC) was created.  The founder National President was Win Hussey.

During the war activities and growth were drastically curtailed, but after the war Ladies' Circle expanded rapidly.  The first circle formed in Wales was Cardiff in 1955; Scotland's first circle was Dumfries in 1956, and in Ireland Enniskillen circle was formed in 1959.  By 1949 it was found that Ladies' Circle was too large an organisation to be managed centrally, so in 1950 a network of 10 Areas was set up.  These rapidly split out into more areas until eventually 55 Areas were formed.  There are currently 39 as some have merged.

In the 1950s Imperial Cancer (now Cancer Research UK) was adopted as the National Charity.  By the 1990s NALC had raised over £1.4 million for Cancer Research UK.

In 1959 Ladies' Circle International (LCI) was formed by the founder countries Great Britain & Ireland, Sweden and Denmark.   Today LCI is an international service organisation represented by approximately 13,000 members, in 36 countries across continents Africa, Asia, Europe and North America.

The Round Table Family

Ladies' Circle is one of the Round Table Family of clubs, which consists of five clubs in total: Round Table, 41 Club, Table Plus, Ladies' Circle and Tangent.

The latter is of particular interest- Tangent is a club for older ladies who are former members of Ladies' Circle (from 2009 some Tangent clubs have open membership and accept women who were not previously members of Ladies' Circle.)

Activities

The focal point of Ladies' Circle is its regular meetings. Normally, most Circles meet twice a month, usually in the evening and often with a meal. Speakers may be invited, or various social events or fundraising activities may take place. Typical events include arts and crafts, sports and keep fit, barbecues, pub meals and formal dinners, theatre and cinema trips, and local fund raising.  Visitors and potential members are always made particularly welcome as Ladies' Circle provides an ideal opportunity to establish new friendships.

It is also possible to take part in international activities via Ladies' Circle International.

Aims and Objects of NALC
 To extend friendship locally, nationally and internationally;
 To promote NALC to eligible women; to assist in the formation of new Circles; and to support all Circles to help them grow;
 To be of service to the community;
 NALC to work side by side with all members of Round Table, 41 Club,Tangent & Agora;
 To conduct the business of the Association in order to promote goodwill between Circles, Areas and the National Association;
 To provide a varied programme of meetings and sociable activities throughout the year.

Aims and Objects of LCI
 To promote international friendship, understanding and goodwill by encouraging members to extend their knowledge of each other and other people.
 To promote, co-ordinate and develop the extension of Ladies' Circle throughout the world.
 To be non-political and non-sectarian
 To promote, co-ordinate & develop working relationships with Round Table wherever possible.

References

Notes

External links

 International Ladies' Circle Website 
 Ladies' Circle International

 National Ladies' Circle Websites 
 Ladies' Circle Austria
 Ladies' Circle Belgium
 Ladies' Circle Canada
 Ladies' Circle Cyprus
 Ladies' Circle Denmark
 Ladies' Circle Estonia
 Ladies' Circle Finland
 Ladies' Circle France
 Ladies' Circle Germany
 Ladies' Circle Great Britain & Ireland
 Ladies' Circle Greece
 Ladies' Circle Hong Kong
 Ladies' Circle Iceland
 Ladies' Circle India
 Ladies' Circle Israel
 Ladies' Circle Italy
 Ladies' Circle Kenya
 Ladies' Circle Latvia
 Ladies' Circle Lithuania
 Ladies' Circle Luxemburg
 Ladies' Circle Malta
 Ladies' Circle Norway
 Ladies' Circle Poland
 Ladies' Circle Romania
 Ladies' Circle South Africa
 Ladies' Circle Sri Lanka
 Ladies' Circle Sweden
 Ladies' Circle Switzerland
 Ladies Circle The Netherlands
 Ladies' Circle United States of America

National Tangent Website
 National Association of Tangent Clubs

The Round Table Family webpage
 The Round Table Family

Round Table and 41 Club websites
 Round Table home
 The Association of Ex-Round Tablers' Clubs (41 Club)

Clubs and societies in the United Kingdom
Mutual organizations